The 2003 Montana Grizzlies football team represented the University of Montana in the 2003 NCAA Division I-AA football season. The Grizzlies were led by first-year head coach Bobby Hauck and played their home games at Washington–Grizzly Stadium.

Schedule

Roster

Team players in the NFL

References

Montana
Montana Grizzlies football seasons
Big Sky Conference football champion seasons
Montana Grizzlies football